The Trossingen Formation, formerly the Knollenmergel, is a geological formation in Germany and Switzerland. It dates back to the late Norian-Rhaetian.

Vertebrate paleofauna

See also 
 List of dinosaur-bearing rock formations
 List of fossiliferous stratigraphic units in Germany
 List of fossiliferous stratigraphic units in Switzerland

References

Bibliography

Further reading 

 Beutler, G. Lithostratigraphie. In: Deutsche Stratigraphische Kommission (Hrsg.): Stratigraphie von Deutschland IV – Keuper. Courier Forschungsinstitut Senckenberg, 253: 65-84, Stuttgart 2005. 
 Nitsch, E. Der Keuper in der Stratigraphischen Tabelle von Deutschland 2002: Formationen und Folgen. Newsletters on Stratigraphy, 41(1-3): 159-171, Stuttgart 2005. 
 Beutler, G., Hauschke< N. und Nitsch< E. Faziesentwicklung des Keupers im Germanischen Becken. In: Norbert Hauschke & Volker Wilde (Hrsg.): Trias – Eine ganze andere Welt. Mitteleuropa im frühen Erdmittelalter. S. 129–174, Verlag Dr. Friedrich Pfeil, München 1999. 
 Mückenhausen, E. Die Bodenkunde und ihre geologischen, geomorphologischen, mineralogischen und petrologischen Grundlagen. 4. erg. Aufl., 579 S., DLG-Verlag, Frankfurt/M. 1993. 
 Schlichting, E. Einführung in die Bodenkunde. 3. Aufl., 131 S, Parey, Hamburg & Berlin, 1993. 
 F. Cimerman. 1963. Ob dinozavrovem grobu - On a dinosaur graveyard Proteus 25(4-5):116-119
 B. Peyer. 1956. Über Zähne von Haramiyiden, von Triconodonten und von wahrscheinlich synapsiden Reptilien aus dem Rhät von Hallau, Kt. Schaffhausen, Schweiz - On the teeth of haramiyids, triconodonts, and probable synapsid reptiles from the Rhaetic of Hallau, Kanton Schaffhausen, Switzerland Schweizerische Paleontologische Abhandlungen 72:1-72
 O. Kuhn. 1939. Beiträge zur Keuperfauna von Halberstadt - Contributions to the Keuper fauna of Halberstadt Paläontologische Zeitschrift 21:258-286
 R. Dehm. 1935. Beobachtungen im oberen Bunten Keuper Mittelfrankens - Observations on the upper Bunter Keuper from middle Franconia Zentralblatt für Mineralogie, Geologie und Paläontologie, Abteilung B: Geologie und Paläontologie 1935(4):97-109
 F. v. Huene. 1934. Ein neuer Coelurosaurier in der thüringischen Trias - A new coelurosaur in the Thuringian Trias Paläontologische Zeitschrift 16(3/4):145-170
 O. Jaekel. 1914. Über die Wirbeltierfunde in der oberen Trias von Halberstadt - On the vertebrate remains in the Upper Triassic of Halberstadt Paläontologische Zeitschrift 1(1):155-215
 W. Obermeyer. 1912. Neue Funde von Tierfährten im Mittleren Keuper bei Stuttgart - New finds of animal tracks in the Middle Keuper of Stuttgart Aus der Heimat 25(5):121, 129-137
 O. Jaekel. 1910. Die Fussstellung und Lebensweise der grossen Dinosaurier - The foot posture and way of life of the large dinosaurs Zeitschrift der Deutschen Geologischen Gesellschaft 62:270-277
 F. v. Huene. 1908. Die Dinosaurier der Europäischen Triasformation mit berücksichtigung der Ausseuropäischen vorkommnisse - The dinosaurs of the European Triassic formations with consideration of occurrences outside Europe Geologische und Palaeontologische Abhandlungen Suppl. 1(1):1-419
 F. v. Huene. 1905. Trias-Dinosaurier Europas - European Triassic dinosaurs Zeitschrift der Deutschen Geologischen Gesellschaft 57:345-349
 H. J. Hagen. 1886. Die geologischen Verhältnisse im Arbeitsgebiete der Naturhistorischen Gesellschaft Nürnberg - The geological conditions in the working areas of the Natural History Society of Nuremberg Abhandlungen der Naturhistorischen Gesellschaft zu Nürnberg 8:1-27
 T. Plieninger. 1850. Prof. Dr. Plieninger, welcher schon zuvor erklärt hatte, nur dann Einiges zur Sprache bringen zu wollen, wenn nach Anhörung der Vorträge auswärtiger Mitglieder noch Zeit übrig wäre, berührte in freiem Vortrag, den er später geschrieben zu den Akten gab, zuletzt noch folgende Gegenstände - Prof. Dr. Plieninger, who had already previously explained that he only would talk about certain things if there was enough time after listening to the presentations by outside members, touched on the following subjects in an informal presentation, of which he subsequently deposited a written record in the archives Jahreshefte des Vereins für Vaterländische Naturkunde in Württemberg 8:161-172
 H. v. Meyer. 1837. Mittheilungen, an Professor Bronn gerichtet - Communications, sent to Professor Bronn Neues Jahrbuch für Mineralogie, Geognosie, Geologie und Petrefaktenkunde 1837:314-317

Geologic formations of Germany
Geologic formations of Switzerland
Triassic System of Europe
Triassic Germany
Triassic Switzerland
Norian Stage
Shale formations
Mudstone formations
Sandstone formations
Conglomerate formations
Marl formations
Deltaic deposits
Fluvial deposits
Lacustrine deposits
Shallow marine deposits
Fossiliferous stratigraphic units of Europe
Paleontology in Germany
Paleontology in Switzerland